Janet Cornfoot was a Scottish accused witch, one of the Pittenweem witches. Although an additional person, Thomas Brown, was also accused of being a witch and died in prison, Cornfoot was the only one of the group who was deliberately put to death.

Biography
Cornfort came from the parish of Leuchars. In 1704, she was accused of taking part in the bewitching of a 16-year-old boy, Patrick Morton, and confessed after being beaten by the local Presbyterian Minister, Patrick Cowper, in Pittenweem Tolbooth. The Scottish High Court refused to convict her, and she was sent back to Pittenweem. She escaped from jail, but was then caught and crushed to death by a lynch mob. The method of Cornfoot's death was particularly unusual because, in Scotland, convicted witches were usually strangled at the stake before having their bodies burned, although there are instances where they were burned alive.

In March 2012, the local community council invited local residents to vote on a proposal for a memorial: one possible design was for a tall metal sculpture in the shape of a door which would have recalled the method of Cornfort's killing  with heavy boulders being loaded up on a door which had been placed on her body. In the event the proposal was rejected and The Scotsman reported a historian as saying that decision had been influenced by the church and "they are not budging on it". It was also reported that some of the residents who were eligible to vote were descendants of the members of the lynch mob.

References 

Witches in art
Pittenweem
Witch trials in Scotland
Witchcraft in Scotland
Lynching deaths
Date of birth missing
1705 deaths